The women's kumite +60 kilograms competition at the 2006 Asian Games in Doha, Qatar was held on 13 December 2006 at the Qatar SC Indoor Hall.

Schedule
All times are Arabia Standard Time (UTC+03:00)

Results
Legend
H — Won by hansoku
K — Won by kiken (8–0)

Main bracket

Repechage

References
Results

External links
Official website

Women's kumite 61 kg